Erik Viktor "Orsa" Bohlin (1 June 1897 – 8 June 1977) was a Swedish road racing cyclist who competed in the 1924 Summer Olympics. He finished seventh in the individual road race and won a team bronze medal.

During his cycling career Bohlin won four national titles and two Swedish six-day races (in 1924 and 1926). He retired in 1927 after finishing fourth at the road world championships. He later changed to motorcycling and, with the engineer Gösta Rödén, created a 250 cc motorcycle that set a new Swedish speed record.

References 

1897 births
1977 deaths
Swedish male cyclists
Olympic cyclists of Sweden
Cyclists at the 1924 Summer Olympics
Olympic bronze medalists for Sweden
Olympic medalists in cycling
People from Orsa Municipality
Medalists at the 1924 Summer Olympics
Sportspeople from Dalarna County
20th-century Swedish people